In 1932, G. D. Birkhoff created a set of four postulates of Euclidean geometry in the plane, sometimes referred to as Birkhoff's axioms. These postulates are all based on basic geometry that can be confirmed experimentally with a scale and protractor. Since the postulates build upon the real numbers, the approach is similar to a model-based introduction to Euclidean geometry.

Birkhoff's axiom system was utilized in the secondary-school textbook by Birkhoff and Beatley.
These axioms were also modified by the School Mathematics Study Group to provide a new standard for teaching high school geometry, known as SMSG axioms.
A few  other textbooks in the foundations of geometry use variants of Birkhoff's axioms.

Postulates

Postulate I: Postulate of line measure.  
The set of points  on any line can  be put into a 1:1 correspondence with the real numbers  so that  for all points  and .

Postulate II: Point-line postulate.  
There is one and only one line  that contains any two given distinct points  and .

Postulate III: Postulate of angle measure.  
Furthermore, if the point  on  varies continuously in a line  not containing the vertex , the number  varies continuously also.

Postulate IV: Postulate of similarity.  

See also
 Euclidean geometry
 Euclidean space
 Foundations of geometry
 Hilbert's axioms
 Tarski's axioms

References

Foundations of geometry
Elementary geometry